QAM stands for Quadrature amplitude modulation

QAM may also refer to:
 QAM (television), digital television standard using quadrature amplitude modulation
  (Quaque die Ante Meridiem), indicates medication should be taken every morning
 Quantum analog of AM complexity class - see QMA
 Queer Azaadi Mumbai, LGBT pride march held in the Indian city of Mumbai

See also 
 Qaem, refers to two completely separate Iranian weapons: an air-to-ground glide bomb and a ground-to-air missile
 Quam (disambiguation)